Higashiyama may refer to multiple things associated with Japan, including:

 Higashiyama (surname), a Japanese surname
 Higashiyama, Iwate, a former town in Iwata Prefecture
 Higashiyama-ku, Kyoto, a ward of the city of Kyoto
 Higashiyama culture, an aesthetic and architectural school from the Muromachi period
 Emperor Higashiyama (1675–1710), Emperor of Japan from 1687 to 1709

See also 
 Higashiyama Station (disambiguation)